Curtis Manning can refer to:

 Curtis Manning (24 character), fictional character in the TV series 24
 Curtis Manning (lacrosse)